Ian Clark, FBA, FLSW (born 14 March 1949) is a British scholar of international relations, who is currently Emeritus Professor of International Politics at Aberystwyth University.

References 

Living people
1949 births
International relations scholars
Fellows of the British Academy
Fellows of the Learned Society of Wales
International relations historians
Alumni of the University of Glasgow
Australian National University alumni
Academic staff of the University of Western Australia
Fellows of Selwyn College, Cambridge
Academics of Aberystwyth University
Academic staff of the University of Queensland